Carex engelmannii is a tussock-forming species of perennial sedge in the family Cyperaceae. It is native to western parts of North America.

See also
List of Carex species

References

engelmannii
Taxa named by Liberty Hyde Bailey
Plants described in 1887
Flora of Colorado
Flora of Idaho
Flora of Montana
Flora of Nevada
Flora of Utah
Flora of Washington (state)
Flora of Wyoming
Flora of British Columbia